Worcester is a town in Washington County, Vermont, United States. The population was 964 at the 2020 census.

History
Worcester was chartered on June 8, 1763 by a Loyalist Governor in New Hampshire.  It has been reported that excellent records were kept on file at the first Town Clerk's office when the Town of Worcester was first settled, but today the exact date of the Town's organization remains a mystery. A fire destroyed the Town's early records.

Geography
According to the United States Census Bureau, the town has a total area of 38.8 square miles (100.6 km2), of which 38.8 square miles (100.4 km2) is land and 0.1 square mile (0.2 km2) (0.21%) is water. The primary settlement is the village of Worcester.

Commerce
The general store in Worcester is called LBJ's Grocery, located at 44 Worcester Village Road. The Post Office Cafe opened next door to LBJ's grocery in 2012, and shares a building with the town's post office.

The Vermont Association of Snow Travelers trail network passes through Worcester.

Worcester's homes and businesses are supplied with water by a mix of private wells and public town water supplied by Worcester Fire District #1. Electricity in Worcester is supplied by Green Mountain Power and Washington Electric Cooperative. Cellular coverage in Worcester is limited, with no service inside many homes in town.

Demographics

As of the census of 2000, there were 902 people, 346 households, and 251 families residing in the town.  The population density was 23.3 people per square mile (9.0/km2).  There were 396 housing units at an average density of 10.2 per square mile (3.9/km2).  The racial makeup of the town was 97.67% White, 0.55% Native American, 0.33% from other races, and 1.44% from two or more races. Hispanic or Latino of any race were 0.89% of the population.

There were 346 households, out of which 34.4% had children under the age of 18 living with them, 60.1% were couples living together and joined in either marriage or civil union, 8.1% had a female householder with no husband present, and 27.2% were non-families. 18.8% of all households were made up of individuals, and 4.0% had someone living alone who was 65 years of age or older.  The average household size was 2.61 and the average family size was 2.96.

In the town, the population was spread out, with 26.4% under the age of 18, 6.8% from 18 to 24, 28.8% from 25 to 44, 31.6% from 45 to 64, and 6.4% who were 65 years of age or older.  The median age was 38 years. For every 100 females, there were 100.4 males.  For every 100 females age 18 and over, there were 100.6 males.

The median income for a household in the town was $39,732, and the median income for a family was $48,750. Males had a median income of $32,083 versus $27,083 for females. The per capita income for the town was $19,698.  About 6.0% of families and 8.5% of the population were below the poverty line, including 8.6% of those under age 18 and none of those age 65 or over.

References

External links 

 
Towns in Vermont
Towns in Washington County, Vermont